Blastobasis parki is a moth in the family Blastobasidae. It was described by Sinev in 1986. It is found in Russia.

References

Natural History Museum Lepidoptera generic names catalog

Blastobasis
Moths described in 1986